The Marshall D. Miller Boathouse is located in Three Lakes, Wisconsin, United States. It was added to the National Register of Historic Places in 2008.

History
The house was constructed by Marshall D. Miller on the north shore of Laurel Lake. In 1949, it was moved to the northern side of the lake.

References

Buildings and structures completed in 1920
Buildings and structures in Oneida County, Wisconsin
Boathouses in the United States
National Register of Historic Places in Oneida County, Wisconsin
Boathouses on the National Register of Historic Places in Wisconsin